Boogami was a search engine launched in August 2008, that was developed by James Wildish, a 16-year-old college student from the United Kingdom.

Features

James was inspired after seeing Alex Tew's success with the Million Dollar Homepage and wanted to see if he could take the pixel phenomenon a step further by integrating a pixel gird directly under the search box of a search engine. Hoping that the search engine would generate recurring visitors and therefore making the pixel space on the homepage valuable. Within the first 24 hours over 5000 pixels at £1 each were sold.

Along with its homepage pixel grid, the feature that users were talking about was named Quick View. Next to each search result was a Quick View button. When clicked a small frame of the website was loaded, which enabled the user to quickly scan through the result before leaving the search engine. This enabled the user to find the relevant information they required quickly, without having to go to and from the search engine.

Boogami Life

In November 2008, James launched Boogami Life, a social networking site. The core objective of the service was to help businesses promote themselves and connect with their target audience and build relationships via the Internet. The service also offered an extended feature named Doorways to all businesses on the network. Doorways enabled businesses to click and build web pages that could be optimised for their keywords and be found by all search engines.

Media attention

Upon launch James was interviewed by BBC Radio, BBC South East, ITV Meridian and appeared in numerous press articles. This caused a flurry of activity on the website, which ultimately caused periods of downtime.

Shutdown

On September 6, 2009 all web searches on Boogami returned "No results". However image search seemed to be unaffected. In October 2009, all of Boogami's services were no longer accessible. No information detailing the closure has been released by the founder.

See also
 Web search engine

References
 Youth creates online ad tool
 The next internet millionaire
 School pupils search engine gives small firms a chance

External links
 Boogami home page
 Boogami Life

Defunct internet search engines